Vodnik (English: Water transport worker) was the All-Union Voluntary Sports Society of Trade Unions. The present professional bandy club Vodnik Arkhangelsk used to be a part of the Vodnik Sports Society.

Notable members
Leonid Geishtor (canoeing)
Valentyn Mankin (sailing)

External links
 Sport Flags of the USSR

Multi-sport clubs in Russia
Sport societies in the Soviet Union
1938 establishments in the Soviet Union